Shrimant Subhedar Male Rao Holkar II Bahadur (1745 – 5 April 1767), belonging to the Holkar dynasty of the Marathas was the Maharaja of Indore (r.1766 – 1767). He was the only son of Khande Rao Holkar Bahadur, and his mother was Ahilya Bai Holkar.

Male Rao Holkar was Heir apparent to his grand father Malhar Rao Holkar since death of his father  Khanderao Holkar in 1754 in Battle of Kumbher.
Malerao was a great warrior. Amazed by his sword fighting skills, Malhar Rao gifted him the Jagir of Sultanpur as a reward in 1761-62.

Death
Male Rao was mentally unwell and died in 1767 due to his disease.
A legend says that Malerao had given death sentence to an innocent person thinking that he was the culprit. After knowing the truth about the victim's innocence he became depressed and mentally ill. During the course of illness, He was not able to sleep for 4 months and finally died in 1767 due to this illness.

References

1745 births
1767 deaths
 Maharajas of Indore
He was the grandson of Malhar Rao Holkar